Schicchi may refer to:

Gianni Schicchi, a comic opera in one act by Giacomo Puccini
Riccardo Schicchi (1953-2012), Italian pornographer